Marioara Munteanu (born  in Brăila) is a Romanian weightlifter, competing in the 53 kg category and representing Romania at international competitions. 

She participated at the 2000 Summer Olympics in the 53 kg event finishing eight and at the 2004 Summer Olympics in the 53 kg event finishing fourth. She competed at world championships, most recently at the 2005 World Weightlifting Championships.

Major results

References

External links
 
http://amarillo.com/stories/091800/spo_romanian.shtml#.WLCPylXyvIU
https://abcnews.go.com/Sports/story?id=100546
http://www.alamy.com/stock-photo-romanias-marioara-munteanu-lifts-during-the-womens-53kg-weightlifting-119783214.html
 http://www.gettyimages.com/photos/marioara-munteanu?excludenudity=true&sort=mostpopular&mediatype=photography&phrase=marioara%20munteanu

1978 births
Living people
Romanian female weightlifters
Weightlifters at the 2004 Summer Olympics
Olympic weightlifters of Romania
Sportspeople from Brăila
Weightlifters at the 2000 Summer Olympics
21st-century Romanian women